Natalia Yurievna Nikonorova (Russian: Наталья Юрьевна Никонорова, Natalya Yuryevna Nikonorova; Ukrainian: Наталія Юріївна Никонорова, Nataliya Yuriyivna Nykonorova; born on 28 September 1984) is a politician who serves as Minister of Foreign Affairs of the Donetsk People's Republic, Permanent Representative at the Trilateral Contact Group in Minsk and head of the interdepartmental committee for the accreditation of humanitarian missions.

Biography

Early life and career 
Nikonorova was born on 28 September 1984, in Donetsk.
In 2001, she graduated from High School No. 115 in Donetsk and entered the International Solomon University in Kyiv.
In 2005, she moved to the Faculty of Law of the KNEU, graduating in 2006.

From 2006 to 2012, on a paid basis, she worked as an assistant to the deputies of the Verkhovna Rada (Ukraine's national parliament) Svyatoslav Piskun and Hennadiy Moskal.
At the same time, since 2008, she attended the graduate school of the Koretsky KIHP, entering the MAUP in 2012.

From 2014 to 2016, she headed the legal department of the People's Council of the Donetsk People's Republic.

Minister of Foreign Affairs of the Donetsk People's Republic 
In 2016, Nikonorova was appointed Minister of Foreign Affairs of the Donetsk People's Republic, later becoming also the head of the interdepartmental committee for the accreditation of humanitarian missions.

Since 2018, she is also a permanent representative of the DPR in the trilateral commission for the settlement of the conflict in Donbass (she had worked as a member of the trilateral commission since 2015).

She was relieved of her post on December 19, 2022.

Personal life 
Her brother Aleksey Yuryevich Nikonorov is also a lawyer of the apparatus of the People's Council of the DPR and also a representative in Minsk.

Natalia and Aleksey's mother has been the head of election campaigns for:
 Alexander Ryzhenkov, the president of Donetsk Metallurgical Plant, for the elections to the Verkhovna Rada of Ukraine;
 Tamara Yegorenko, the chairman of the Lenin district executive committee of Donetsk;
 Yuriy Ryzhenkov, the general director of Metinvest (central company of Rinat Akhmetov).

References 

1984 births
Living people
People of the Donetsk People's Republic
Women government ministers
Foreign ministers
21st-century women politicians
Members of the Federation Council of Russia (after 2000)